The United States Department of Justice Civil Division represents the United States, its departments and agencies, members of Congress, cabinet officers, and other federal employees. Led by the United States Assistant Attorney General for the Civil Division, the Division's litigation reflects the diversity of government activities, involving, for example, the defense of challenges to presidential actions; national security issues; benefit programs; energy policies; commercial issues such as contract disputes, banking insurance, patents, fraud, and debt collection; all manner of accident and liability claims; enforcement of immigration laws; and civil and criminal violations of consumer protection laws. Each year, Division attorneys handle thousands of cases that collectively involve billions of dollars in claims and recoveries. The Division confronts significant policy issues, which often rise to constitutional dimensions, in defending and enforcing various Federal programs and actions.

In April 2021, President Joe Biden nominated Javier Guzman to lead the division as Assistant Attorney General. That nomination was withdrawn on July 20, 2021.

Organization
The Civil Division is made up of the following offices:
Appellate Staff 
Commercial Litigation Branch
Civil Frauds Section
General Corporate/Financial Litigation Section
Intellectual Property Section 
Foreign Litigation Section
National Courts Section
 Consumer Protection Branch
Federal Programs Branch
National Security, Foreign Relations, and Law Enforcement Section
Interstate and Foreign Commerce Section 
Government Agencies and Corporations Section 
Nondiscrimination Personnel Litigation Section 
Discrimination in Employment Litigation Section 
Human Resources Section
Interior, Agriculture, and Energy Concerns Section
Housing and Community Development Section
Freedom of Information and Privacy Section
Regulatory Enforcement and Defensive Banking Litigation Section
Disability Litigation Section
Office of Immigration Litigation (OIL)
Appellate Section
District Court Section
Office of Management Programs
Torts Branch
Aviation, Space & Admiralty Section
Federal Tort Claims Act Section
Environmental Torts Section
Constitutional and Specialized Torts Section
Tobacco Litigation Section

List of assistant attorneys general

References

External links
 

Civil Division